Fairly Odd Coaster (known formerly as Timberland Twister) is a spinning roller coaster themed to The Fairly OddParents that opened on March 15, 2004, at Nickelodeon Universe in the Mall of America. Individual cars have two rows facing each other and each car spins independently throughout the course of the ride. The ride is geared toward families. The ride was installed by Ride Entertainment Group, who handles all of Gerstlauer's operations in the Western Hemisphere.

Ride experience 
The ride vehicles exit the boarding station and climb a 54 foot tall hill. At the top, the vehicles are released and enter a series of flat tight curves to get them spinning. Guests then ride through: a set of speed-retarders, several helix turns, an additional set of speed retarders, a series of large track-hills, another set of speed retarders, and a series of fast sharp bumps. Riders then take one last tight sideways turn, and the vehicles return to the boarding station.

History
Fairly Odd Coaster opened as "Timberland Twister" when the park was themed to Camp Snoopy, and is the first spinning roller coaster from Gerstlauer and the first of its kind. A month later, an identical ride opened at Worlds of Fun amusement park in Kansas City, Missouri called Spinning Dragons. A discontinued feature of Fairly Odd Coaster was an on-ride video system that allowed guests to purchase DVDs of their ride on the attraction.

The Fairly Odd Coaster name was previously shared with rollercoasters at Carowinds in Charlotte, North Carolina and Kings Island near Cincinnati, Ohio before they were both renamed and rethemed as Woodstock Express.

References

External links
 Specifications at ultimaterollercoaster.com
 Review at ultimaterollercoaster.com

Nickelodeon Universe
Roller coasters in Minnesota
Roller coasters introduced in 2004
2004 establishments in Minnesota
The Fairly OddParents